Hopkins County Courthouse may refer to:

Hopkins County Courthouse (Kentucky), a contributing building in Madisonville Commercial Historic District
Hopkins County Courthouse (Texas)